Crepis bakeri is a species of flowering plant in the family Asteraceae known by the common name Baker's hawksbeard. It is native to the western United States where it grows in many types of mountain and plateau habitat. It is found in Oregon, Washington, Idaho, northern California, Nevada, and Utah.

Crepis bakeri is a perennial herb producing a dark green, hairy, glandular stem up to about 30 centimeters (12 inches) tall from taproot and a thick caudex at ground level. The leaves are narrowly oval and fringed with shallow lobes. They are dark dusty green with reddish or purplish veins and the basal leaves approach 20 centimeters (8 inches) in maximum length. The inflorescence is an open array of up to 22 flower heads. Each has a base of lance-shaped phyllaries which are hairy and often bristly. The flower head contains up to 60 yellow ray florets. There are no disc florets. The fruit is a thin achene up to a centimeter long with an off-white pappus.

Subspecies
 Crepis bakeri subsp. bakeri – California, Nevada, Oregon, Washington
 Crepis bakeri subsp. cusickii (Eastw.) Babc. & Stebbins  – California, Oregon, Utah
 Crepis bakeri subsp. idahoensis Babc. & Stebbins – Idaho, California

References

External links
Calflora Database: Crepis bakeri (Baker's hawksbeard)
Jepson Manual Treatment
USDA Plants Profile for Crepis bakeri (Baker's hawksbeard)
UC Calphotos gallery

bakeri
Flora of California
Flora of Nevada
Flora of the Great Basin
Flora of the Northwestern United States
Plants described in 1895
Taxa named by Edward Lee Greene
Flora without expected TNC conservation status